Vazha-Pshavela is a metro station on the Saburtalo Line in Tbilisi, Georgia. The station is named after the Georgian poet Vazha-Pshavela. The station was opened on 3 April 2000. It is located on Vazha-Pshavela avenue close to the Vazha-Pshavela statue. The metro station serves Vazha-Pshavela blocks and nearby streets and upland neighborhoods of Saburtalo. The station walls have illustrations depicting Vazha-Pshavela's works.

Initially, the station was supposed to be an intermediate station on the  –  extension, but due to lack of financing the construction of the latter had been frozen. Because of the delay, only a single track was available at the station until the full extension to State University which opened on 16 October 2017.

References

Railway stations opened in 2000
Tbilisi Metro stations
2000 establishments in Georgia (country)